Quedius capucinus is a species of large rove beetle in the family Staphylinidae.

References

Further reading

External links

 
 

Staphylininae
Beetles described in 1806